The Madison Square Fountain, also known as the Southern Fountain, is an ornamental fountain located in Madison Square Park in the Flatiron District of Manhattan, New York.  It was the only one of several planned fountains to be realized.  The current fountain is a modern reproduction of the original, installed in 1990 and renovated in 2015.

History and description

The fountain was originally located on the site of the Old Post Office. It was begun in 1842 and completed in 1843, before being rededicated in Madison Square Park on June 28, 1867.

The fountain is made of North Jay granite. An inscription reads,  Urns surrounding the fountain are planted with flowers during summer months and other plants during the holiday season.

See also

 1843 in art

References

External links

 

1843 establishments in New York (state)
1843 sculptures
1990 establishments in New York City
1990 sculptures
Buildings and structures completed in 1843
Buildings and structures completed in 1990
Flatiron District
Fountains in New York City
Granite sculptures in New York City
Outdoor sculptures in Manhattan